Delftse Poort is a twin-tower skyscraper complex at Weena 505 next to the Rotterdam Centraal railway station in Rotterdam, Netherlands. Until May 2009, Tower I was the tallest office tower in the Netherlands. Both towers are built over a 4-storey multifunctional podium which adjoins the Rotterdam central station. The entire complex has 28 elevators.

It was constructed between 1988 and 1991. The cost of the construction was 240 million Dutch guilders, or about €110 million. Due to a metro tunnel running underneath the complex, advanced construction methods were required, allowing only a single underground floor to be built. The building is also known as Nationale-Nederlanden building, because until 2015 the Dutch Company 'Nationale-Nederlanden' (National-Netherlands) was the main user of the building. Nationale-Nederlanden was the local insurance branch of ING Insurance until 2014. Nationale-Nederlanden became a tenant renting only a third of the building complex, and hence their logo on Tower I was removed. Since then the building has established its own identity, displaying its own logo on Tower I.

Until 2004, an annual race up the building's stairs took place in this building.

References

External links
 http://www.delftsepoort.nl/

Skyscrapers in Rotterdam
Skyscraper office buildings in the Netherlands
Office buildings completed in 1992
Twin towers